Old Ironsides  is a 1926 American silent historical war film directed by James Cruze and starring Charles Farrell, Esther Ralston, Wallace Beery, and George Bancroft. It was produced and distributed by Paramount Pictures.

Plot
Early in the 19th century, USS Constitution is launched as part of an effort to stop piracy in the Mediterranean Sea. Meanwhile, a young man determined to go to sea (Farrell) is befriended by the bos'n (Beery) of the merchant ship Esther, and he joins its crew. When Esther reaches the Mediterranean, she too, along with Constitution, becomes involved in the battle against the pirates.

Cast
Charles Farrell as "The Commodore"
Esther Ralston as Esther
Wallace Beery as Bos'n
George Bancroft as Gunner
Charles Hill Mailes as Captain Preble
Johnnie Walker as Lieutenant Stephen Decatur (billed as Johnny Walker)
Eddie Fetherston as Lieutenant Somers
George Godfrey as The Cook
William Conklin as Esther's Father
Nick De Ruiz as The Bashaw
Effie Ellsler as Esther's Mother
Frank Jonasson as Pirate Captain
Duke Kahanamoku as Pirate Captain
Boris Karloff as A Saracen Guard
Fred Kohler as Second Mate

Gary Cooper was in the film as an extra.

Production background
The movie was directed by James Cruze in a widescreen process that Paramount promoted as "Magnascope". This process was used to heighten the visual effects in specific points in the film by switching to a larger "widescreen" thus enhancing the visual drama of the feature. It was reported that at the premiere of Old Ironsides the audience "stood up and cheered" when the Magnascope was activated.

This lavish oceangoing epic features battle scenes with sailing ships and pirates; Wallace Beery would revisit the genre and portray Long John Silver in Treasure Island eight years later.

Box office receipts from the premiere at the Rialto Theater went to the  restoration fund.

Production
 A real 1886 ship, S. N. Castle was burned and sunk for the film off of Catalina Island.
 A closeup of a tattoo on George Bancroft's arm reveals that his character's name is also "G. Bancroft".

Availability
Paramount Studios released a VHS video tape edition in 1987.

The Museum of Modern Art in New York City exhibited a restored 35mm print of the film in December 2008.

See also
 List of American films of 1926
 Boris Karloff filmography

References

External links

1926 films
1920s war drama films
American war epic films
War of 1812 films
Seafaring films
American silent feature films
American black-and-white films
Paramount Pictures films
Films directed by James Cruze
American historical drama films
1920s historical drama films
Films set in the Mediterranean Sea
American war drama films
1926 drama films
Films set in 1804
Films set in 1805
Barbary Wars
1920s American films
Silent American drama films
Silent adventure films
Silent war drama films
1920s English-language films